The Mountain West Collegiate Hockey League (MWCHL) is a collegiate hockey conference within Division 2 of the American Collegiate Hockey Association (ACHA). It is made up of eight universities throughout the Western United States. Four members are from the state of Utah, while the remaining four are from Montana and North Dakota.

History
The MWCHL's founding members were Boise State, BYU, the University of Denver, Montana State, Montana Tech, Utah State and Weber State. Other previous members include the University of Wyoming and Grand Canyon.

Members

Champions

Membership Timeline

See also
American Collegiate Hockey Association 
List of ice hockey leagues

References

ACHA Division 2 conferences
2013 establishments in the United States